Mexican Boarders is a 1962 Warner Bros. Looney Tunes cartoon short directed by Friz Freleng. The short was released on May 12, 1962, and stars Speedy Gonzales and Sylvester. Voice actors are Mel Blanc (doing the voices of Sylvester and Speedy), and Tom Holland as the narrator.

The cartoon has Sylvester trying to catch Speedy in a house they share in Mexico. Sylvester switches targets when Slowpoke Rodriguez, Speedy's cousin, comes to visit. This is the second and final classic Looney Tunes short (after Mexicali Shmoes) to feature Slowpoke Rodriguez.

Plot
Speedy Gonzales, "the fastest mouse in all Mexico", is living in the "fine hacienda of José Álvaro Meléndez" in an unnamed "big city" in Mexico where fellow resident Sylvester the Cat (dubbed "Sylverro Gato" here) is "the most pooped cat in all Mexico" from his futile attempts to catch Speedy. He eats pep pills for energy to catch the mouse, to no effect. Their pursuit is interrupted when Speedy's country cousin, Slowpoke Rodriguez, knocks on the door.

Taller, thinner, and slower talking than Speedy, Slowpoke arrives carrying a bindle stick and singing "La Cucaracha". Sylvester, seeing easier prey, lets Slowpoke into the hacienda where he is quickly rescued by Speedy. Complaining of hunger, Slowpoke sets out for the kitchen to get food only to be rescued again by Speedy. Speedy successfully raids the kitchen for cheese but Slowpoke complains that his cousin forgot the Tabasco sauce. During this second raid, Sylvester paints the floor with glue and actually catches Speedy but winds up swallowing the hot sauce, not the mouse, and Speedy escapes.

After a very large meal, Slowpoke announces that he's ready for dessert. An incredulous Speedy makes another raid on the pantry where Sylvester has put up a wire mesh to stop the mice. Speedy runs right through the large holes with Sylvester right behind, stretching the mesh but passing through apparently unharmed. As the chase continues, Sylvester falls to pieces one cube at a time.

That night, as Slowpoke and Speedy go to sleep in bunk beds made from match boxes, Slowpoke says he's still hungry and gets up to stage his own kitchen raid over Speedy's objections. Slowpoke reassures him, "maybe Slowpoke is pretty slow downstairs in the feet, but he is pretty fast upstairs in the cabeza." Sylvester does swiftly capture Slowpoke but the mouse instantly mesmerizes the cat, making him an unwilling servant to bring them food and cool them with a fan. ("I like your pussycat friend. He's nice and stupid.")

Other media
Portions of this short were edited into the 1964 short Road to Andalay and the 1982 feature film Bugs Bunny's 3rd Movie: 1001 Rabbit Tales.

Home media
The unedited cartoon was released on DVD in November 2006 on the third disc of Looney Tunes Golden Collection: Volume 4. This DVD release includes a commentary track by animator Greg Ford.

See also
 List of American films of 1962

References

External links

Looney Tunes shorts
Warner Bros. Cartoons animated short films
1962 films
Films scored by Milt Franklyn
1962 animated films
1962 short films
Short films directed by Friz Freleng
Speedy Gonzales films
Sylvester the Cat films
Animated films about cats
Animated films about mice
Films set in Mexico
1960s Warner Bros. animated short films
1960s English-language films
Films about hypnosis